D. maxima may refer to:

 Dipetalogaster maxima, a kissing bug
 Doodia maxima, an eastern Australian fern